Peter Hallström is a Swedish songwriter, musician and artist. His song Håll Mitt Hjärta (Hold my heart) is the number one favorite song at funerals all over Sweden according to Fonus. The song is also performed at many weddings. 

Kärleksvisan (For A Friend) is the second most appreciated love song according to listeners of one of the largest radio stations in Sweden Mix Megapol. In 2017 the song was ranked top ten among the most played songs at weddings in Sweden according to the daily newspaper Metro. The song was performed by Sarah Dawn Finer at the evening festivities at the Stockholm Concert hall as a gift from the Swedish parliament and the Swedish people the evening before the royal wedding between Crown Princess Victoria and Prince Daniel of Sweden in 2010.

The song Viskar en bön is played a lot around Christmas time. Hallström also wrote the song I Remember Love, performed by Sarah Dawn Finer. It was placed 4th in the final of Melodifestivalen 2007. 

As a background vocalist Peter has participated at ten Melodifestivalen TV-shows and three Eurovision Song Contests. As a background singer he also contributes to other recordings with various artists.

Discography
Hallström has released three records with Swedish lyrics.

Albums
All of the records can be found on Spotify.

References 

Swedish songwriters	
1965 births
Living people
Swedish gospel musicians